Tullio Biscuola (12 July 1899 – 13 February 1963) was an Italian marathon runner.

Biography
He competed in the marathon at the 1924 Summer Olympics, this is the only caps in national team.

The Olympic experience of Tullio Biscuola is remembered because it happened to the not so young age of 33, fact unusual for the time. In the town of Rovigo a sport venue is dedicated to his memory.

Achievements

References

External links
 
  L'avventura olimpica di Tullio Biscuola
 Polesani alle Olimpiadi: Tullio Biscuola

1899 births
1963 deaths
Athletes (track and field) at the 1924 Summer Olympics
Italian male long-distance runners
Italian male marathon runners
Olympic athletes of Italy
People from Rovigo
Sportspeople from the Province of Rovigo